James A. Beneway High School is a high school in the Wayne Central School District in Ontario, New York. The School offers Advanced Placement and Gemini courses and is one of only 2 schools in Wayne County to offer the International Baccalaureate Diploma program. The School Enrollment is approximately 800.

References

Public high schools in New York (state)
Schools in Wayne County, New York